Gymnobela cyrillei is an extinct species of sea snail, a marine gastropod mollusk in the family Raphitomidae.

Description

Distribution
Fossils of this marine species were found in Upper Oligocene strata in Southwest France.

References

 Lozouet (P.), 2017 - Les Conoidea de l’Oligocène supérieur (Chattien) du bassin de l’Adour (Sud-Ouest de la France). Cossmanniana, t. 19, p. 1-179

cyrillei
Gastropods described in 2017